PayU is a Netherlands-based payment service provider to online merchants. The company was founded in 2002, and is headquartered in Hoofddorp. It allows online businesses to accept and process payments through payment methods that can be integrated with web and mobile applications. As of 2018, the service is available in 17 countries. The firm is owned by the Naspers Group, which also owns a stake in one of its sister companies, Tencent.

History
PayU is the result of multiple payment gateways in various regions of the world that have  been acquired and brought into the PayU group. In 2014, all online payments companies that were part of Naspers started operating under the PayU brand.

Investment and acquisitions
 Acquired Zooz, an Israeli startup that provides an API to merchants.
Acquired of Indian payments services provider Citrus Pay in September 2016 for $130M.
Investment of €110M in German fintech company Kreditech, which provides machine-learning based underwriting.
PayU led a funding round of  $115M in Seattle-based Remitly, a remittance company.
Series A investment of $3.7M in ZestMoney, a provider of consumer finance for online purchases.
Invested $5.3M in Paysense in May 2017
Investment of R$60M in online credit platform Creditas (ex-BankFacil)
2011, acquired Romanian online payments company GECAD ePayments
2019, acquired US-based digital financial security firm Wibmo for $70M
2019, acquired Turkish digital payments company Iyzico for $165M
2020, acquired fintech startup PaySense for $185M
2022, fired 6% of its workforce

Operations

Europe
In November 2006, PayU SA was established and the Polish firm Platnosci.pl was merged into the group. The company also has a partnership with Iwoca to make financing for SME firms easier. In 2010, the company expanded to the Czech Republic. In 2011, the company expanded to Romania. In 2021, it began its operations in Russia, Turkey, Slovakia and Hungary.

Latin America
In 2002, Pagosonline was founded in Colombia by Jose Velez, Martin Schrimpff and Santiago Spinel.

In 2010, PagosOnline sold a majority stake to Buscapé, which was a part of the Naspers Group. In 2011, Naspers acquired the majority stake in DineroMail. In 2013, Naspers acquired the rest of the shares of DineroMail. In 2012, Naspers acquired Pagosonline, replacing the former two with a new payment platform that eventually was rebranded PayU Latam, which began operations in Panama and Peru. During the course of 2013 and 2014, PayU Latam and DineroMail merged. In 2016, Bcash and PayU, were merged under the PayU brand in Brazil.

Africa
PayJar was founded in South Africa in 2010 as part of the Naspers group to help other Naspers companies process online payments. In 2011, PayJar was rebranded to PayU. In 2015, PayU expanded its operations to Nigeria.

India
In 2011, Ibibo in conjunction with co-founders Nitin Gupta and Shailaz Nag, rolled out a payment gateway, PayU, in the Indian market to permit websites to integrate e-commerce transactions through online payments.

Products and services
PayU is a regulated financial institution. It holds licenses from national banks and local regulators. PayU's products include a PCI-DSS certified payment gateway, an anti-fraud system and an online Visa/MasterCard acquirer.

See also
List of online payment service providers

References

External links
 

Payment service providers
Financial services companies established in 2002
Companies based in North Holland
Privately held companies of the Netherlands
Online payments